Leiton Jiménez Romero (born 26 April 1989) is a Colombian footballer who plays as a centre back for Tampico Madero in the Ascenso MX. He also holds Mexican citizenship.

References

External links
 
 Leiton Jiménez at Transfer to Mexico
 Leiton Jiménez at Informador
 

1989 births
Living people
People from Quibdó
Colombian footballers
Colombia international footballers
Independiente Medellín footballers
Chiapas F.C. footballers
C.D. Veracruz footballers
Club Tijuana footballers
Atlas F.C. footballers
Lobos BUAP footballers
Categoría Primera A players
Liga MX players
Colombian expatriate footballers
Colombian expatriate sportspeople in Mexico
Expatriate footballers in Mexico
Naturalized citizens of Mexico
Association football central defenders
Sportspeople from Chocó Department
21st-century Colombian people